Arthur Ernest Watson (29 February 1880 – 18 September 1969) was a British newspaper editor, known for editing The Daily Telegraph from 1924 to 1950.

Biography 
Watson was born in Newcastle upon Tyne on 29 February 1880, the second son of Aaron Watson, author and journalist, and his wife, Phebe. He attended Alleyn's School in Dulwich, Rutherford College of Technology in Newcastle, and Armstrong College of the University of Durham, before entering journalism. After a spell with the Newcastle Daily Leader, he joined  The Daily Telegraph in 1902. He was with the newspaper for the remainder of his career, although he served during World War I as an acting Major in the Royal Field Artillery. He became the Telegraph's Assistant Editor in 1923, and was appointed Editor the following year, serving until 1950. He was also active in the Institute of Journalists, and in retirement was the President of the Mitcham and Morden Conservative Association.

References

1880 births
1969 deaths
People educated at Alleyn's School
Alumni of Northumbria University
British Army personnel of World War I
British newspaper editors
Writers from Newcastle upon Tyne
Royal Field Artillery officers
The Daily Telegraph people
Alumni of Armstrong College, Durham
20th-century English businesspeople